Dennis Erdmann (born 22 November 1990) is a German professional footballer who plays as a defensive midfielder or centre back for Colorado Springs Switchbacks in the USL Championship.

Career
In June 2019, Erdmann joined TSV 1860 Munich on a two-year contract.

On 18 July 2021, he joined 1. FC Saarbrucken on a free transfer.

On 5 January 2022, Erdmann moved to the United States and signed with Colorado Springs Switchbacks.

References

External links
 
 

1990 births
Living people
German footballers
Association football defenders
Association football midfielders
2. Bundesliga players
3. Liga players
Regionalliga players
FC Schalke 04 II players
Dynamo Dresden players
FC Hansa Rostock players
1. FC Magdeburg players
TSV 1860 Munich players
1. FC Saarbrücken players
Colorado Springs Switchbacks FC players
German expatriate footballers
German expatriate sportspeople in the United States
Expatriate soccer players in the United States
USL Championship players